Tomalley (from the Carib word , meaning a sauce of lobster liver), crab fat, or lobster paste is the soft, green substance found in the body cavity of lobsters, that fulfills the functions of both the liver and the pancreas. Tomalley corresponds to the hepatopancreas in other arthropods. It is considered a delicacy, and may be eaten alone but is often added to sauces for flavour and as a thickening agent. The term lobster paste or lobster pâté can also be used to indicate a mixture of tomalley and lobster roe. Lobster bisque, lobster stock, and lobster consommé are made using lobster bodies (heads), often including tomalley.

The hepatopancreas of a crab is also called tomalley, or crab "fat"; in crabs the tomalley is yellow or yellow-green in color. In Maryland and on the Delmarva Peninsula, the hepatopancreas of the blue crab is called the "muster" or "mustard", probably because of the yellow color, which is not the bright yellow of regular prepared yellow mustard, but closer to one of the brown mustards, such as Dijon mustard. Particularly when eating steamed or boiled crabs, it is considered a delicacy.

Health risks
The tomalley in general can be consumed in moderation (as with the livers of other animals). It can, however, contain high levels of polychlorinated biphenyls (PCBs) which can give a number of negative health effects in large concentrations. It may also contain toxins that are associated with paralytic shellfish poisoning (saxitoxin and gonyautoxin). Those toxins do not leach out when the lobster is cooked in boiling water. The toxins responsible for most shellfish poisonings are heat- and acid-stable, and thus are not diminished by cooking.

A report from the Maine Department of Marine Resources in July 2008 indicated the presence of high levels of paralytic shellfish poisoning toxin in some tomalley from lobsters in that state. Around the same time, The Massachusetts Department of Public Health reminded consumers not to eat lobster tomalley, because this part of the lobster can build up high levels of toxins and other pollutants. The U.S. Food and Drug Administration then issued an advisory against consuming tomalley from American lobster found anywhere in the Atlantic Ocean. But in the same advisory the FDA stated that lobster tomalley "normally does not contain dangerous levels of PSP toxins" and that the current high toxin levels were probably "associated with an ongoing red tide episode in northern New England and eastern Canada".

See also
Surimi
Taba ng talangka
List of crab dishes

References

Further reading

True lobsters
Seafood